The Rugby-Sport-Verein Köln is a German rugby union club from Cologne, currently playing in the Rugby-Bundesliga. It is part of the multi-sports club ASV Köln, which also offers other sports like athletics, triathlon and karate.

History

Sports club

The club was formed on 27 February 1929, under the name of Akademischen Sportverein Köln, by students of the University of Cologne. In 1936, it severed its connection to the university and renamed itself to Athletik-Sport-Verein Köln, its current name.

Rugby department
The rugby department of the ASV was formed on 1 March 1951, being the second-oldest sports department of the club.

The team initially played friendlies against British Army sides and clubs from Belgium before taking part in the German championship from 1953 onwards.

ASV, in recent history, was part of the Rugby-Bundesliga South/West, being relegated in 2001 to the 2nd Rugby-Bundesliga South/West when the Bundesliga was reduced to single-division format.

The club then finished second in its league three times, in 2002, 2007 and 2009. It managed to win its division in 2008 but lost the 2nd Bundesliga final 6–22 to RK 03 Berlin and missed out on promotion. It was however promoted the following season, when the league was won by the reserve team of SC 1880 Frankfurt. Reserve teams being ineligible for Bundesliga promotion, ASV took its spot instead. Suffering from a string of injuries and heavy defeats during the season, the club made the decision in mid-April 2010, to withdraw from the Rugby-Bundesliga and not to play its five remaining matches as they were no longer able to field a full front row. Köln thereby were automatically relegated from the league.

A league reform in 2012 allowed the club promotion to the Bundesliga after the league was expanded from ten to 24 teams. ASV finished fourth in their group in the 2012-13 season and qualified for the south/west division of the championship round, where it came seventh. The club was knocked out in the first round of the play-offs after losing 84–7 to Berliner Rugby Club. The following two seasons, 2013–14 and 2014–15, it qualified for the championship round once more but finished last in its group and did not qualify for the play-offs.

Since the season 2017–18 the club competes under its new name Rugby-Sport-Verein Köln (RSV Köln).

Club honours
 2nd Rugby-Bundesliga 
 Runners up: 2008
 2nd Rugby-Bundesliga South/West
 Champions: 2008
 Runners up: 2002, 2007, 2009

Recent seasons
Recent seasons of the club:

Men

 Until 2001, when the single-division Bundesliga was established, the season was divided in autumn and spring, a Vorrunde and Endrunde, whereby the top teams of the Rugby-Bundesliga would play out the championship while the bottom teams together with the autumn 2nd Bundesliga champion would play for Bundesliga qualification. The remainder of the 2nd Bundesliga teams would play a spring round to determine the relegated clubs. Where two placing's are shown, the first is autumn, the second spring. In 2012 the Bundesliga was expanded from ten to 24 teams and the 2nd Bundesliga from 20 to 24  with the leagues divided into four regional divisions.

Women

References

External links
   Official club website
  Official website of the rugby department
 ASV Köln club info at totalrugby.de

German rugby union clubs
Rugby clubs established in 1951
Sport in Cologne
Rugby union in North Rhine-Westphalia
1951 establishments in West Germany